Stewart Murisa (born 18 July 1974) is a retired Zimbabwean football striker.

References

1974 births
Living people
Zimbabwean footballers
Zimbabwe international footballers
CAPS United players
AmaZulu F.C. players
Cape Town Spurs F.C. players
Dynamos F.C. players
Highlanders F.C. players
Bidvest Wits F.C. players
Association football forwards
South African Premier Division players
Zimbabwean expatriate footballers
Expatriate soccer players in South Africa
Zimbabwean expatriate sportspeople in South Africa